Transmembrane channel-like 8 is a protein which in humans is encoded by the TMC8 gene.

Function
The protein encoded by this gene is an integral membrane protein that localize to the endoplasmic reticulum and is predicted to form transmembrane channels. This gene encodes a transmembrane channel-like protein with 8 predicted transmembrane domains and 3 leucine zipper motifs.

Clinical significance
Mutations in the TMC8 gene are associated with epidermodysplasia verruciformis (EV), an autosomal recessive dermatosis characterized by abnormal susceptibility to human papillomaviruses (HPVs) and a high rate of progression to squamous cell carcinoma on sun-exposed skin.

References

Further reading